A by-election was held for the New South Wales Legislative Assembly electorate of East Macquarie on 6 October 1864 because of the resignation of William Suttor Sr.

Dates

Result

William Suttor Sr. resigned.

See also
Electoral results for the district of East Macquarie
List of New South Wales state by-elections

References

1864 elections in Australia
New South Wales state by-elections
1860s in New South Wales